Tourism in Iceland has grown considerably in economic significance in the past 15 years. As of 2016, the tourism industry is estimated to contribute about 10 percent to the Icelandic GDP; the number of foreign visitors exceeded 2,000,000 for the first time in 2017; tourism is responsible for a share of nearly 30 percent of the country's export revenue.

History

Services provided to foreign tourists were for a long time an insignificant part of the Icelandic economy, rarely contributing more than 2 percent to GDP, even long after the advent of international air travel. Until the early 1980s, the number of foreign visitors to Iceland increased slowly and erratically, never exceeding 80,000 in a single year, and for many years after that only barely kept pace with the increase in the number of Icelanders travelling to and from the country. This situation lasted until the turn of the century, when the annual number of visitors exceeded the total resident population for the first time, at around 300,000.

A few years later the Icelandic tourism industry started to experience a boom which to this day shows no signs of abating, as witnessed by the fact that the number of foreign visitors grew on average by 6 percent per year between 2003 and 2010, and by some 20 percent per year on average between 2010 and 2014. In 2015, this rapid increase has continued, with the number of foreign visitors already exceeding 1 million in the period January to October. According to the Icelandic Tourist Board, the total number of overnight stays by foreign visitors to Iceland grew from 595,000 in 2000 to 2.1 million in 2010, before rising to 4.4 million in 2014.

The number of people working in tourism-related industries in Iceland was 21,600 in 2014, representing nearly 12 percent of the total workforce, and tourism's direct contribution to GDP is now close to 5 percent.

Tourist demographics
Iceland is well known for its untouched nature and unique atmosphere.
Iceland receives the highest number of tourists during summer (June–August). In 2014, around 42% of visitors arrived in Iceland during its summer months, proportionally a slight decrease compared to the previous two years, the percentage of winter visitors having increased by over 4% in the same period. As of year 2014, Iceland's largest tourism markets comprises tourists from Central/South Europe, followed by those from other regions: North America, the UK, then the Nordic countries.  In terms of visitors from individual countries, the top five for 2014 were the UK, USA, Germany, France and Norway.  Canada had the largest percentage increase in visitor numbers in the 2013-2014 period, with an increase of over 60% year on year.

Popular tourist destinations
According to a survey carried out by the Icelandic Tourist Board in 2014, the following 10 destinations are the ones most frequently visited in Iceland, out of 39 specifically mentioned in the survey (the percentages indicate the proportion of all foreign tourists visiting the destination in question and relate to the summer season, some of the destinations being less easily accessible in winter).

Arrivals by country
Most visitors arriving in Iceland through the main airport are from the following countries of nationality:

See also
Iceland
Economy of Iceland
Elf/Huldufólk Tourism
List of museums in Iceland

References

External links

Icelandic Tourist Board
 Icelandic Tourist Board in North America

regional sites of the Icelandic Tourist Board
for  Reykjavík
for  West Iceland
for[Westfjords
for  North Iceland
for East Iceland
for South Iceland
for Reykjanes

 
Iceland